Falsilunatia ambigua is a species of deepwater sea snail, a marine gastropod mollusc in the family Naticidae, the moon snails.

References

 Suter, H. (1913). New species of Tertiary Mollusca. Transactions and Proceedings of the New Zealand Institute. 45, 294–297, pls. 12–14.
 Dell, R. K. (1956). The archibenthal Mollusca of New Zealand. Dominion Museum Bulletin. 18: 1-235 page(s): 74
 Spencer, H.G., Marshall, B.A. & Willan, R.C. (2009). Checklist of New Zealand living Mollusca. Pp 196-219. in: Gordon, D.P. (ed.) New Zealand inventory of biodiversity. Volume one. Kingdom Animalia: Radiata, Lophotrochozoa, Deuterostomia. Canterbury University Press, Christchurch
 Maxwell, P.A. (2009). Cenozoic Mollusca. Pp 232-254 in Gordon, D.P. (ed.) New Zealand inventory of biodiversity. Volume one. Kingdom Animalia: Radiata, Lophotrochozoa, Deuterostomia. Canterbury University Press, Christchurch

Naticidae
Gastropods of New Zealand
Gastropods described in 1956